"Underwater World" is single released in 1984 by the Finnish rock and glam punk band Hanoi Rocks. "Underwater World" is from the band's US-breakthrough album Two Steps From The Move, and was released as a single and as an EP in August 1984 in Finland and in November in the UK.

The song was recorded with the rest of the album at the Record Plant in New York City and finished at the Phase One studio in Toronto, Ontario. The band's guitarist and primary songwriter Andy McCoy described the song in August 1984 in the Finnish music magazine Soundi: "What could i say about it? It's a cool song, it swings. I don't want to say anything about the lyrics. Everybody can have their own interpretation".  Later the band Guns N' Roses took the title of their hit song, "Welcome to the Jungle" from "Underwater World's" chorus where Michael Monroe sings: "Welcome to the ocean. Welcome to the sea. Welcome to the jungle. Deep inside of me.".

The song "Shakes" was recorded in the same sessions as the whole Two Steps From The Move album and was produced by the album's producer Bob Ezrin. The song was still left off the album, but it was featured on multiple compilations. "Magic Carpet Ride" was also left out of the album but was included on the remastered CD-version and on a Finnish compilation. "Oil And Gasoline" was produced by McCoy, Monroe and Gregg Kofi Brown (Osibisa), who was also the second producer on "Magic Carpet Ride". Brown also played bass on "Oil And Gasoline". Monroe, McCoy and Brown were the only ones playing on "Oil And Gasoline".

Track listing

Personnel
Michael Monroe - Lead vocals, saxophone
Andy McCoy - Lead guitar, backing vocals
Nasty Suicide - Rhythm guitar
Sam Yaffa - Bass
Razzle - Drums
Gregg Kofi Brown - Bass on "Oil And Gasoline"

Hanoi Rocks songs
1984 songs
Song recordings produced by Bob Ezrin
Songs written by Andy McCoy